Christian Albert Clemmensen (19 February 1869 – 27 February 1937) was a Danish journalist and prolific writer of books on Danish industrial and cultural history. He was president of the Danish Union of Journalists in 1890–1899.

Early life and education
Clemmensen was born in Copenhagen on 18 February 1869, the son of Sergant Mads Clemmensen (1831–1915) and  Sidsel Clemmensen (née Albrechtsen; 1829–1909). He graduated from Østre Borgerdydskole in 1887. He taught Latin and French privately in 1890–1899.

Career
Clemmensen  worked as a journalist for Samfundet in 1899–1905 and frp, 1905 for Nationaltidende (from 1931 Dagens Nyheder). He was president of the Danish Union of Journalists in 1926–1930 and a board member of Dansk Arbejde.

He wrote an extensive number of books on Danish commercial and cultural history.

Selected written works
 Haandværkerforeningen i Kjøbenhavn. Bidrag til Foreningens Historie i Aarene 1890-1915, Haandværkerforeningen (1915)
 Omkring Københavns Kvægtorv (1929)
 Vægter-Bogen (1926,)
 Tivoli gennem 75 Aar (1918)
 Forlagsboghandler G. E. C. Gad (1930)
 Johannes Neye. 1881-5. Oktober-1931 (1931)

References

1869 births
1937 deaths
Danish writers
19th-century Danish historians
20th-century Danish historians